William Gabriel Weidersjö (born 10 June 2001) is a Swedish-born Thai professional footballer who plays as a midfielder for Thai League 1 club Port.

Club career
Weidersjö played for various clubs in Sweden before coming back to Thailand to sign a contract with Thai League 1 side Port in January 2022.

International career
On 16 March 2022, Weidersjö was called up to the Thailand national under-23 football team for the 2022 Dubai Cup. On 26 March 2022, he played his first national match against China PR and also scored his first international goal.

International goals

Under-23

Personal life
Weidersjö was born and raised in Sweden and is of Thai descent.

Honours

International
Thailand U23
 Southeast Asian Games  Silver medal: 2021

References

External links
 

2001 births
Living people
William Weidersjö
William Weidersjö
Swedish footballers
William Weidersjö
Swedish people of Thai descent
Association football midfielders
William Weidersjo
Hammarby Talang FF players
William Weidersjo
Ettan Fotboll players
Competitors at the 2021 Southeast Asian Games
William Weidersjo